Tresh is a surname. Notable people with the surname include:
Mike Tresh (1914–1966), American baseball player
Tom Tresh (1938–2008), American baseball player